is one of 24 wards of Osaka, Japan. It is named after the Shitennō-ji (Temple of the Four Heavenly Kings), which is located in the ward.

General information

Tennōji Station is the city's main southeastern rail terminal with Osaka Municipal Subway's Tennōji Station Midōsuji Line and Tanimachi Line, JR Tennōji as the terminus of the JR Hanwa Line (and a major stop on the Kyoto Line, Osaka Loop Line, Yamatoji Line and Kansai Airport Line) and the Kintetsu Abenobashi Station, directly across the street from Tennōji station is the terminus of the Minami Osaka Line. As a result of its being a major railway hub, it has become a major built up area in southern Osaka. The buildings around the station include, the Kintetsu department store, Mio, Station Plaza, and Hoop shopping malls, Apollo Movie Theater and Lucias shopping mall, as well as the more recent Q's Mall. In addition, there are several shopping streets in the area including Abenobashisuji.  The Kintetsu Abeno Harukas building, which houses the Kintetsu department store, was fully opened in the spring of 2014 and is currently the tallest building in Japan at 300 meters (984 ft.) in height.

Economy
Aigan, the eyeglasses (spectacles) chain, is headquartered in Tennōji-ku. Descente, a sportswear company, also has its headquarters in the ward.

Attractions 

 Shitennō-ji Temple – the first Buddhist temple in Japan – is a historical site only a ten-minute walk from Tennōji Station.
 Ikukunitama Shrine – Shinto shrine
 Isshin-ji is a major Buddhist temple located between Tennoji Park and Shitennō-ji.
 Tennōji Park, (immediately west of the station), includes the Osaka Municipal Museum of Art and Tennōji Zoo.
 Chausuyama Kofun is a possible Kofun located inside Tennōji Park.

Entertainment 

Tennōji ward is home to the Osaka Municipal Museum of Art, Tennōji Zoo, the Keitaku-en Japanese garden (built by the Sumitomo Corporation) and the Tennōji Botanical Garden.

There are four major shopping centers near Tennōji Station: Mio, a fashionable, upscale mall; Kintetsu Department Store; Hoop, and Q's Mall-  targeted primarily at younger shoppers, but also home to a large number of restaurants and eateries.

The nearby Shinsekai entertainment district was established in the early part of the last century and still teems with scores of eateries. It is overlooked by the Tsutenkaku tower, one of Osaka's most famous symbols.

Education

Public schools:
 Shimizudani High School
Private schools:
 Shitennoji Junior and Senior High School

Train stations

West Japan Railway Company (JR West)
Osaka Loop Line: Tennōji Station – Teradachō Station – Momodani Station – Tsuruhashi Station – Tamatsukuri Station
Hanwa Line, Kansai Main Line (Yamatoji Line): Tennōji Station
Kintetsu Railway
Osaka Line: Osaka Uehommachi Station – Tsuruhashi Station
Osaka Abenobashi Station on the Minami Osaka Line in Abeno-ku is close to Tennōji Station in Tennōji-ku.
Hankai Tramway
Hankai Uemachi Line: Tennōji-eki-mae Station (Located in Abeno-ku, but close to Tennōji Station in Tennōji-ku.)
Osaka Metro
Tanimachi Line: Tanimachi Kyuchome Station – Shitennoji-mae Yuhigaoka Station – Tennōji Station 
Tennōji Station on the Midōsuji Line is located in Abeno-ku, but close to Tennōji-ku.
Sennichimae Line: Tanimachi Kyuchome Station – Tsuruhashi Station
Nagahori Tsurumi-ryokuchi Line: Tamatsukuri Station

Notable people
Aiko Nakamura, former professional tennis player.
Akiko Wada, singer, tarento and businesswoman
Daiki Yoshikawa, Japanese professional baseball player
Mr. Hito, Japanese professional wrestler
Ryosuke Irie, Japanese competitive swimmer 
Sana Minatozaki, singer, member of South Korean girl group Twice
Takeshi Kaikō, prominent post-World War II Japanese novelist, short-story writer, essayist, literary critic, and television documentary screenwriter
Yoshihiro Tatsumi, Japanese manga artist
Kitamura Kazuki, Japanese Film and Television Actor

References

External links

 Official website of Tennōji

Wards of Osaka